The 1883 Maryland gubernatorial election took place on November 6, 1883.

Incumbent Democratic Governor William Thomas Hamilton did not seek re-election.

Democratic candidate Robert Milligan McLane defeated Republican candidate Hart B. Holton.

General election

Candidates
Robert Milligan McLane, Democratic, former U.S. Congressman
Hart B. Holton, Republican, incumbent U.S. Congressman

Results

Notes

References

1883
Gubernatorial
Maryland